Regional health authority may refer to:
Regional health authority (UK)
Regional health authority (Norway)
Regional Health Authority (Trinidad and Tobago)

See also 

 the Health regions of Canada, many of which have "regional health authority" as part of their legal title